In card games, a talon (French for "heel") is a stack of undealt cards that is placed on the table to be used during the game. Depending on the game or region, they may also be referred to as the blind, kitty, skat, stock, tapp or widow (US).

Description 
In 1909, Meyers Lexicon described the talon as "the cards left over after dealing..." In games of chance, such as
Pharo, it is "the stock of cards which the banker draws on". The talon is usually a pack of cards, placed face down, in the middle of the card table. In other games, there are however very different variations, for example in Königrufen. Talons may be placed face up or face down.

Parlett describes a kitty as "the pool or pot being played for" or "a dead hand or widow". He also equates talon to stock as the "cards which are not dealt initially but may be drawn from or dealt out later in the play".

Examples of usage 
The following are examples of games and the term usually used for talon. They are taken from Parlett unless otherwise indicated:
 Blind:  Auction Euchre, Cego, Frog, Sheepshead, Six-Bid
 Cego: Cego
 Dabb: Binokel
 Doaba: Jaggln
 Dobb: Dobbm
 Kitty: Bid Whist, Five-Card Brag, Five Hundred, Newmarket, Three-Card Brag,  Crash, Sergeant-Major
 Pott: Tausendundeins
 Skat: Admirals' Skat, Fipsen, North American Skat, Ramsch, Schieberamsch, Skat
 Start: Tausendundeins, Wallachen
 Stock: Bavarian Tarock, Belote, Bezique, Bisca, Bondtolva, Bourre, Briscola, California Jack, Canasta, Coinche, Crazy Eights, Cuarenta, Durak, Écarté, Eleusis, Gleek, Hand and Foot, Tausendundeins, Klaberjass, Klondike, Marjolet, Ristiklappi, Rummy, Sixty-Six, Skitgubbe, Toepen, Tute
 Stoß: German Rummy
 Talon: Bauernschnapsen, Binokel, Bohemian Schneider, Droggn, Écarté, Elfern, Gaigel, German Rummy, Guinguette, Hungarian Tarock, Illustrated Tarock, Königrufen, Mau-Mau, Mariás, Mauscheln, Mizerka, Nain Jaune, Piquet, Préférence, Preference, Russian Bank, Schnapsen, Sixty-Six, Treppenrommé, Ulti
 Tapp: Binokel, Cego, Tapp, Tapp Tarock, Troggu
 Widow: Army and Navy Pinochle, Auction Euchre, Auction Manille, Auction Pinochle, Frog, Smear, Widow Cinch, Widow Hearts,  Widow Nap/Sir Garnet, Widow Pinochle

See also 
 Glossary of card game terms

Footnotes

References

Literature 
 Dummett, Sir Michael (1980). The Game of Tarot. London: Duckworth. 

Card game terminology
Playing cards